Lake Rondaxe is a lake located northeast of Carter Station, New York. Fish species present in the lake are Atlantic salmon, rainbow trout, smallmouth bass, brook trout, yellow perch, and black bullhead. There is no public access.

Locations and tributaries 
West Lake – A small 32 acre lake located south of Lake Rondaxe. West Lake empties into Lake Rondaxe. Fish species in West Lake include brook trout, white sucker, bullhead, rock bass, smallmouth bass, and yellow perch. Carry down access located on east shore. 
Mountain Pond – A small pond located east of Lake Rondaxe. Mountain Pond empties into Lake Rondaxe.

References 

Lakes of Herkimer County, New York